(died 700) was a Japanese princess during the Asuka Period. She was a daughter of Emperor Tenji. Her mother was Lady Tachibana, whose father was Abe no Kurahashi Maro.

Although few episodes about her are recorded in the chronicles, she seemed to be a person of considerably high position, because it is recorded that, when she became ill, Empress Jitō visited her, and that Kakinomoto no Hitomaro, a famous poet in this period, produced a long lament poet for her when she died on the 4th day of the 4th month in 700.

References

Links 

Imperial House of Japan

Japanese princesses
700 deaths
Year of birth unknown
7th-century Japanese women
Daughters of emperors